is J-pop artist Mayumi Iizuka's 13th album.

Exposition 
 This, Mayumi Iizuka's 13th album, was released with love and thanks for the fans. This work mainly consists of up-tempo numbers that would cheer her listeners up.
 The actual greatest hits album "Mayu Natsu Selection" (means "Best Summer Selection by Mayumi") with 15 songs is also enclosed herewith, splendidly.
 "Tobou yo!" (#11) and "Tsuki to Kaerimichi" (#14), both contained by "Mayu Natsu Selection", are initially selected for an album.

Track listing

CD1 - Fight!! 
 Prism (プリズム)
 Lyrics: Shinichi Asada
 Composition: Shinichi Asada
 Arrangement: Michiaki Kato
 Yeah! Yeah! Yeah!
 Lyrics: Sora Izumikawa
 Composition: Sora Izumikawa
 Arrangement: Ruka Kawata
 Befriend
 Lyrics: Sora Izumikawa
 Composition: Ruka Kawata
 Arrangement: Makoto Miyazaki
 Kimi wa Kimi no Mama de (君は君のままで / You As You Are)
 Lyrics: Sora Izumikawa
 Composition: Sora Izumikawa
 Arrangement: Michiaki Kato
 Omoide-zora (オモイデゾラ / The Memorable Sky)
 Lyrics: Mayumi Iizuka
 Composition: Shinichi Asada
 Arrangement: Michiaki Kato
 Fight!! (ファイト!!)
 Lyrics: Mayumi Iizuka
 Composition: HoshiMai (Mayumi Iizuka)
 Arrangement: Tomofumi Suzuki
 Niji to Suashi no Story (虹と素足のストーリー / The Story of Rainbow and Barefoot)
 Lyrics: Shinichi Asada
 Composition: Shinichi Asada
 Arrangement: Tomofumi Suzuki
 Tadaima. Okaeri. (ただいま。おかえり。 / I'm Back. Welcome Back.)
 Lyrics: Mayumi Iizuka
 Composition: HoshiMai (Mayumi Iizuka)
 Arrangement: Tomoki Hasegawa
 Smile!
 Lyrics: Mayumi Iizuka
 Composition: Tomoki Hasegawa
 Arrangement: Tomoki Hasegawa
 Boku no Partner (僕のパートナー / My Partner)
 Lyrics: Mayumi Iizuka
 Composition: Sora Izumikawa
 Arrangement: Makoto Miyazaki

CD2 - Mayu Natsu Selection 
 Tobitatsu Kisetsu (とびたつ季節 / The Departure Season)
 Kimi to Ozora e (君と大空へ / Go to the Sky with You) 
 My Happy Day
 Hajimete no Ichi-page (初めての1ページ / The First Page)
 Himawari (ひまわり / Sunflowers)
 Drive Shiyou yo! (ドライブしようよ! / Let's Drive!) 
 Romantic Dane (ロマンチックだね / What a Romantic)
 Sankyu (さんきゅっ / Thank You)
 Babyblue
 Kimi to Ita Memory (君といたMemory / Memory with You) 
 Tobou yo! (とぼうよ! / Let's Fly!)
 Niji no Saku Basho (虹の咲く場所 / Where Rainbow Blooms)
 Blue no Story (ブルーのストーリー / Blue Story)
 Tsuki to Kaerimichi (月と帰り道 / The Moon and the Way Home)
 Remember

External links 
 Mayumi Iizuka's New Album Release Special Live: Zakzak Anime Seiyu  - July 2009

2009 albums
Mayumi Iizuka albums